Evansville is an unincorporated community in Tunica County, Mississippi, United States.

It is named for Clayton Evans, an early settler.

The Evansville Mounds are listed on the National Register of Historic Places.

References

Unincorporated communities in Tunica County, Mississippi
Unincorporated communities in Mississippi
Memphis metropolitan area